This is a list of public art in Dumfries and Galloway, one of the 32 local government council areas of Scotland.

Dumfries and Galloway comprises the historic counties of Dumfriesshire and the two counties collectively known as Galloway, the Stewartry of Kirkcudbright and Wigtownshire. The council area borders South Ayrshire, East Ayrshire, South Lanarkshire, the Scottish Borders, Cumbria in England, the Solway Firth and to the west the Irish Sea.
This list applies only to works of public art on permanent display in an outdoor public space and does not, for example, include artworks in museums.

Annan

Balmaclellan

Canonbie

Carsphairn

Corsock

Dalbeattie

Dumfries

Ecclefechan

Gatehouse of Fleet

Gretna

Isle of Whithorn

Kirkcudbright

Kirkpatrick Durham

Kirkpatrick Fleming

Langholm

Lochmaben

Lockerbie

Mennock

Moffat

Penpont

Portpatrick

Stranraer

Thornhill

Whithorn

Wigtown

References

Dumfries and Galloway
Outdoor sculptures in Scotland
Statues in Scotland